The 2019 FIBA Women's EuroBasket final was played at the Štark Arena in Belgrade, Serbia, on 7 July 2019 between defending champions Spain and previous runners-up France.

Spain won their fourth title winning 86–66 in the final.

Road to the final

Match details

References

External links
Official website

final
2019
Sports competitions in Belgrade
2010s in Belgrade
Basketball in Belgrade